Vardousia is a former municipality in Phocis, Greece. Since the 2011 local government reform, it is a municipal unit of the municipality Dorida. The municipal unit has an area of 253.725 km2. Population 1,391 (2011). The seat of the municipality was in Krokyleio. It was named after the mountain Vardousia, which is located in the municipal unit.

Subdivisions
The municipal unit Lidoriki is subdivided into the following communities:
Alpochori
Artotina
Dichori
Kerassies
Kokkino
Koupaki
Kriatsi
Krokyleio
Pentagioi
Perivoli
Tristeno
Ypsilo Chori
Zorianos

References

Populated places in Phocis